Senator Kemp may refer to:

Brian Kemp (born 1963), Georgia State Senate
Marcus A. Kemp (1878–1957), Wisconsin State Senate